Hardy Häman-Aktell (born July 4, 1998) is a Swedish professional ice hockey player who is currently playing with the Växjö Lakers of the Swedish Hockey League (SHL). Häman-Aktell was drafted 108th overall in the 2016 NHL Entry Draft by the Nashville Predators.

Awards and honours

References

External links

1998 births
Living people
IF Björklöven players
Nashville Predators draft picks
People from Skellefteå Municipality
Sportspeople from Västerbotten County
Swedish ice hockey defencemen
Växjö Lakers players